This is a list of the largest cities in each U.S. state and territory by historical population, as enumerated every decade by the United States Census, starting with the 1790 Census. Data for the tables below is drawn from U.S. Census Bureau reports. For the 1990 Census and earlier, the primary resource is the 2005 Working Paper number POP-WP076. Post-1990 data, as well as data for territories, is drawn from the respective year's Census. Some locales may have pre-existed their first appearance in the U.S. Census, but such values are not included here, unless otherwise noted.

Total population counts for the Censuses of 1790 through 1860 include both free and enslaved persons. Native Americans were not identified in the Census of 1790 through 1840 and only sporadically from 1850 until 1890 if they lived outside of Indian Territory or off reservations. Beginning with the 1900 census, Native Americans were fully enumerated along with the general population. Shaded areas of the tables indicate census years when a territory or the part of another state had not yet been admitted as a new state.

1790–1840

1840–1880

1890–1930

1940–1980

1990–2020

See also
 List of most populous cities in the United States by decade
 List of U.S. states and territories by historical population
List of United States cities by population
List of largest cities of U.S. states and territories by population

Notes

References

 
Demographic history of the United States
Histories of cities in the United States
United States Cities By Historical Population By State
Largest City, Historical
United States demography-related lists